The 1969 Los Angeles Dodgers finished in fourth place in the new National League Western Division, eight games behind the Atlanta Braves.  The Dodgers' record for 1969 was 85–77, which was nine wins better than 1968.

Offseason 
 October 21, 1968: Bob Bailey was purchased from the Dodgers by the Montreal Expos.
 October 21, 1968: Jim Ellis was traded by the Dodgers to St. Louis Cardinals for Pete Mikkelsen.
 December 4, 1968: Mike Kekich was traded by the Dodgers to the New York Yankees for Andy Kosco.
 December 5, 1968: Jim Campanis was acquired from the Dodgers by the Kansas City Royals.
 March 30, 1969: Ted Savage was traded by the Dodgers to the Cincinnati Reds for Jimmie Schaffer.

Regular season 
After finishing 8th in 1967 and 7th in 1968, the Dodgers looked to improve in 1969 with the addition of youngsters Ted Sizemore, Bill Sudakis, and by obtaining Tom Haller in a trade. The Dodgers started fast and on June 10, they were in 2nd place at 31–22, 1 game back in a wild 5 team N.L. West race.  On June 11, they reacquired Maury Wills in a trade, and obtained Manny Mota in the same deal for Ron Fairly and Paul Popovich. By July 16, they were in 1st place, and after beating the Mets on September 3, they were in second place, 1 game back. Centerfielder Willie Davis had just extended his club record 31 game hitting streak. They headed to San Diego to face the expansion Padres in a 4-game series and disaster struck. They scored 4 runs in 4 games, lost 4 in a row, and Davis had his hitting streak stopped in the first game. They left San Diego in 4th place, still only 2½ games out. They rebounded somewhat, and when they beat the Atlanta Braves on September 18, they were one-half game behind co-leaders Atlanta and the San Francisco Giants as they headed to San Francisco. The pressure of the season long five team pennant race got to this young team, as they lost 10 of their next 11 games, ultimately finishing 85–77, 8 games behind division winning Atlanta.

Impact
While they did not win the division, the 1969 Dodgers marked the start of a turnaround for the franchise. After finishing 8th and 7th in 1967 and 1968 respectively, they would not finish in the bottom half of the standings again until 1984. Ted Sizemore won the rookie of the year award, and other youngsters like Steve Garvey, Bill Russell, Von Joshua, Bobby Valentine, and Bill Buckner contributed in back up roles. Waiting in the wings in the minors were Ron Cey, Davey Lopes, Tom Paciorek, and manager Tommy Lasorda.

Season standings

Record vs. opponents

Opening Day lineup

Notable transactions 
 April 17, 1969: Tommy Dean and Leon Everitt were traded by the Dodgers to the San Diego Padres for Al McBean.
 June 11, 1969: Ron Fairly and Paul Popovich were traded by the Dodgers to the Montreal Expos for Maury Wills and Manny Mota.
 August 15, 1969: Chuck Goggin, Ron Mitchell (minors) and cash were traded by the Dodgers to the Pittsburgh Pirates for Jim Bunning.
 September 1, 1969: Jack Jenkins was purchased by the Dodgers from the Washington Senators.

Roster

Player stats

Batting

Starters by position 
Note: Pos = Position; G = Games played; AB = At bats; H = Hits; Avg. = Batting average; HR = Home runs; RBI = Runs batted in

Other batters 
Note: G = Games played; AB = At bats; H = Hits; Avg. = Batting average; HR = Home runs; RBI = Runs batted in

Pitching

Starting pitchers 
Note: G = Games pitched; IP = Innings pitched; W = Wins; L = Losses; ERA = Earned run average; SO = Strikeouts

Other pitchers 
Note: G = Games pitched; IP = Innings pitched; W = Wins; L = Losses; ERA = Earned run average; SO = Strikeouts

Relief pitchers 
Note: G = Games pitched; W = Wins; L = Losses; SV = Saves; ERA = Earned run average; SO = Strikeouts

Awards and honors 
National League Rookie of the Year
Ted Sizemore
Gold Glove Award
Wes Parker
NL Player of the Month
Willie Davis (August 1969)

All-Stars 
1969 Major League Baseball All-Star Game
Bill Singer, reserve

Farm system 

LEAGUE CHAMPIONS: Rogue Valley, Ogden

1969 Major League Baseball Draft

This was the fifth year of a Major League Baseball Draft.  The Dodgers drafted 47 players in the June draft and 11 in the January draft.

The Dodgers first round selection in the June draft, High School Catcher Terry McDermott did make it to the Majors, in 1972, but played only 9 games.

The only player from this draft class who made any impact in the Majors was Lee Lacy, who was drafted twice this year... as a third baseman in the January draft and as a pitcher in the June draft. He was primarily an outfielder in the Majors, and played through 1987 with the Dodgers, Braves, Pirates and Orioles.

Notes

References 
Baseball-Reference season page
Baseball Almanac season page

External links 
1969 Los Angeles Dodgers uniform
Los Angeles Dodgers official web site

Los Angeles Dodgers seasons
Los Angeles Dodgers season
Los Angel